Vazhayur  is a census town in Malappuram in the state of Kerala, India. The Vazhayur Census Town has population of 36,909 of which 18,163 are males while 18,746 are females as per report released by Census India 2011. The 2018 Malayalam film Sudani from Nigeria was shot in Vazhayur. The town forms a portion of the Malappuram metropolitan area.

Population of Children with age of 0-6 is 4306 which is 11.67% of total population of Vazhayur (CT). In Vazhayur Census Town, Female Sex Ratio is of 1032 against state average of 1084. Moreover, Child Sex Ratio in Vazhayur is around 958 compared to Kerala state average of 964. Literacy rate of Vazhayur city is 95.79% higher than state average of 94.00%. In Vazhayur, Male literacy is around 97.44% while female literacy rate is 94.19%.

Vazhayur Census Town has total administration over 7,883 houses to which it supplies basic amenities like water and sewerage. It is also authorized to build roads within Census Town limits and impose taxes on properties coming under its jurisdiction.

Prominent Organizations
DHRISHYA PONNEMPADAM
SAFI Institute of Advanced Study
Ponnempadam Kalasamithi (onnam number beedi company)
Farook College
PMSAPT Higher Secondary School
Vedavyasa Institute of Technology
Horizon international School
Alfarook College, Feroke
Irunnamanna Mahavishnu Temple, 4,000 years old. Renovated in 2016.
ecobuild mountain slope villas
ecobuild projects

Proposed Karipur-Kondotty Municipality 
The proposed Karipur-Kondotty Municipality comprises:
Kondotty panchayat (villages of Kondotty, and part of Karipur)
Nediyiruppu panchayat (villages of Nediyiruppu, and part of Karipur)
Pallikkal panchayat (villages of Pallikkal, and part of Karipur)
Pulikkal panchayat
Cherukavu panchayat
Vazhayur panchayat

Total Area: 122.99 km2

Demographics

 India census, Vazhayur had a population of 32486 with 16083 males and 16403 females.

Transportation
Vazhayur village connects to other parts of India through Calicut town on the west and Nilambur town on the east.  National highway No.66 passes through Azhinjilam Junction  and the northern stretch connects to Goa and Mumbai.  The southern stretch connects to Cochin and Trivandrum.  State Highway No.28 starts from Nilambur and connects to Ooty, Mysore and Bangalore through Highways.12,29 and 181. The nearest airport is at Kozhikode.  The nearest major railway station is at Feroke.

Suburbs and Villages
Vazhayur Town, Karad, Kottupadam, Kakkov, Puchapadam and Channayilpalliyali
 Akode, Virippadam and Oorkkadavu
 Korappadam, Mundumuzhi and Vazhakkad
 Valillappuzha and Edavannappara

References

   Cities and towns in Malappuram district
Kondotty area